On April 22, 2020, an outbreak of discrete supercell thunderstorms across portions of Oklahoma, Texas, and Louisiana led to widespread severe weather, including multiple strong tornadoes. Two people were killed by a high-end EF2 that struck the town of Madill, Oklahoma, and three more were killed by an EF3 wedge tornado that moved through Onalaska, Texas. Dozens of others were injured as well. The event came to fruition as a trough progressed eastward across the United States, interacting with a moist and unstable environment. Tornado activity continued into Arkansas, Louisiana, Mississippi, Alabama, Florida, and Georgia overnight into the day on April 23. Isolated tornado activity also occurred during the overnight hours on April 21.

Meteorological synopsis
On April 19, the Storm Prediction Center outlined portions of the U.S. Southern Plains with a 15% area of severe weather within 25 miles of any point. A Slight risk was maintained across much of the same areas in the subsequent day 3 outlook, but parts of southeastern Oklahoma, much of northeastern Texas, southwestern Arkansas, and northwestern Louisiana were upgraded to an Enhanced risk on April 21. This risk area was maintained in the lead-up to the event on April 22. Confidence in organized severe weather came as a southwest-to-northeast oriented trough moved eastward across the United States, interacting with a corridor of low-level moisture and instability ahead of this feature. Throughout the early morning hours of April 22, discrete thunderstorms posing a risk for damaging winds and hail developed across Oklahoma, north of an approaching warm front. Farther south across central Texas and into western Louisiana, elevated convection began to increase in the presence of strong wind shear, with the expectation that those storms would become surface based with time as they progressed into a region of modest daytime heating.

Isolated tornadic activity was observed in Oklahoma during the overnight hours of April 21. By mid-afternoon the next day, a low-pressure area progressed into southwestern Oklahoma, supporting a quasi-stationary front across southern Oklahoma and a sharpening dry line southward into central Texas. The combination of partially sunny skies and dew points in the upper 60s Fahrenheit led to a very unstable environment across northwestern Texas and into southwestern Oklahoma. Thunderstorm activity soon developed in the vicinity of the area of low pressure, but the highest risk of tornadic activity was expected to materialize farther east where the direction of surface winds would be more conducive to rotating storms. As the storms tracked eastward, multiple damaging tornadoes were reported. Farther south across eastern Texas and western Louisiana, a subtle warm front and an additional surface boundary proved to be the impetus for convection to develop supercell characteristics. One such supercell in Walker and Houston counties further organized as it curved right into an undisturbed environment of high wind shear and moisture. This long-tracked cell maintained prominence and spawned additional tornadoes for several hours as it continued through Louisiana and into Western Mississippi. On its trail, additional storms in a moderately unstable, highly sheared environment continued to pose a threat for all hazards. Severe weather from this group of storms continued throughout the overnight hours along the Gulf Coast, with large swath of wind damage and tornadoes continuing into April 23. More storms fired up just offshore of the Florida panhandle as the first band moved off the coast around mid-day. These storms produced more tornadoes and wind damage before weakening that night.

Confirmed tornadoes

April 21 event

April 22 event

April 23 event

Onalaska–Seven Oaks, Texas

This large, intense wedge tornado first touched down at 5:35 p.m. CDT (22:35 UTC) in Polk County along the north shore of Lake Livingston northwest of Onalaska south of FM 356. It then moved along the north shore of the lake, blowing down several trees while throwing several others into the lake. The tornado then rapidly strengthened as it briefly moved over the north part of the lake before causing major damage in Onalaska. Reaching low-end EF3 intensity, it first struck the Paradise Acres community on a small peninsula in the northwestern part of town. Numerous homes and manufactured homes were heavily damaged or destroyed in this area, and many trees were snapped or denuded as well. A few well-built frame homes sustained loss of their roofs and exterior walls along this segment of the path. It then moved back over Lake Livingston before moving ashore on the north side of Onalaska. The tornado was slightly weaker here, but still produced widespread high-end EF2 damage as many manufactured and site-built homes in neighborhoods south of FM 356 were damaged or destroyed, with debris strewn throughout the area. Dozens of trees were snapped or uprooted as the tornado crossed FM 356 before it entered another neighborhood on the northeast side of town. Several frame homes had their roofs torn off and exterior walls collapsed along and east of FM 3459 while other manufactured homes were completely destroyed. All three deaths and 33 injuries from the tornado occurred in Onalaska. The tornado weakened as it moved east-northeast out of Onalaska and crossed over the extreme northeastern part of Lake Livingston. Trees and homes along the shore were damaged at EF1 strength before the tornado moved into rural areas of Polk County and crossed FM 3152, mostly snapping or uprooting countless hardwood and softwood trees, although one house along FM 350 suffered roof damage. Two mobile homes were completely destroyed as the tornado crossed the concurrent US 59 and Future I-69 and hardwood trees in the area were snapped, denuded, and partially debarked. The tornado then weakened back to EF1 strength as it continued to the east-northeast, damaging more trees, including one large tree that fell on a mobile home, destroying it while barely missing a man sitting at his computer. The tornado then dissipated near FM 942 southwest of Barnes at 6:15 p.m. CDT (23:15 UTC).

A total of 291 homes were affected by the tornado in Onalaska alone, 46 of which were destroyed. All three fatalities and 33 injures were also in Onalaska. This was the first of multiple strong tornadoes from this long–tracked supercell. This was also the second time Onalaska had been struck by a strong tornado with the first time being May 1, 1967, when an F2 tornado moved through town, injuring two people.

See also

 List of North American tornadoes and tornado outbreaks
 List of United States tornadoes in April 2020

Notes

References

2020 disasters in the United States
Tornadoes of 2020
April 2020 events in the United States
Tornadoes in Oklahoma
Tornadoes in Texas
Tornadoes in Louisiana